Mads Østberg (born 11 October 1987) is a Norwegian rally driver. His co-driver is Torstein Eriksen.

Career

Østberg competed in his first rally in 2004. His first World Rally Championship event was the 2006 Swedish Rally, in which he finished 31st in his Subaru Impreza WRC 2003. In the 2006 season, he competed in two more WRC rallies; retiring at the Rally Finland and finishing 23rd at the Wales Rally GB.

In the 2007 season, Østberg continued with an Impreza WRC 2005 and competed in six world rallies for the Prodrive-supported Adapta team. He took his first stage win on a super special stage of the 2007 Swedish Rally, and later achieved his first WRC point by finishing eighth at the 2007 Rally Finland. Østberg also contested the Norwegian Rally Championship and won the national title.

In 2008, Østberg continued to race with Adapta Motorsport in the WRC, using a Subaru Impreza WRC 2007. He did not score any championship points in his seven events. In the 2009 season, Østberg scored points on three WRC rounds and recorded his best-ever finish at the Rally Portugal, finishing sixth. His Adapta AS team was supported by Prodrive because of Subaru's withdrawal from the championship.

In the following season, Østberg contested four WRC rallies in an Impreza WRC 2007 & 2008 and two in a Ford Fiesta S2000. For the second year in running, he placed 11th in the drivers' world championship. Østberg moved to Stobart M-Sport Ford for the 2011 season, driving a Ford Fiesta RS WRC, attaining a second place in 2011 Rally Sweden after leading much of the rally. He gained another second-place finish at 2011 Rally GB, the final round, and ended sixth in the drivers championship.

In 2012, Østberg reverted to Adapta Motorsport, despite continued to race with a Fiesta RS WRC. After a 3rd place in Sweden, he won his first rally at the 2012 Rally de Portugal after Mikko Hirvonen was disqualified. This made him the first non-French/Finnish driver to win a rally since 2005 and the second Norwegian event winner in WRC history. Østberg followed this up with a third place in Rally Argentina before going on to finish the season in fourth place.

Østberg returned to Qatar M-Sport for the 2013 season, this time M-Sport is a 'De Facto' Ford leading team after the American manufacturer's official withdrawal at the end of the 2012 season. Østberg secured two podium finishes and ended the season in sixth place of the drivers championship. In December of that year, it was announced that Østberg will move to Citroën's works team for 2014 with Kris Meeke as his team-mate.

In 2014, Østberg got four podiums, topping at the second place. He got the fifth rank at the drivers championship.

In 2015, Østberg continued to drive for the Citroën World Rally Team. After four competitions, he got two second places and ranked second at the drivers championship. He finally ended the season as the "best of the rest", ranked fourth in the championship behind the trio of VW drivers.

At the end of the 2015 season, it was announced that Østberg would return to M-Sport for 2016, this time driving the Evolution version of the Fiesta RS WRC. He would be partnered by Andreas Mikkelsen's former co-driver Ola Fløene. Østberg got two third places and finished seventh in the standings.

Østberg announced he would take on a limited schedule in a private entry for 2017 (shared with Martin Prokop) as he and wife Beate welcomed his first child in late February.

WRC victories

Rally results

WRC results

WRC-2 results

WRC-2 Pro results

ERC results

References

External links

 Official website
 eWRC-results.com profile

1987 births
Living people
World Rally Championship drivers
Norwegian rally drivers
Citroën Racing drivers
M-Sport drivers
European Rally Championship drivers